Wilfred Leonard "Duke" Childs (April 11, 1881 – December 20, 1964) was an American basketball coach in the early 1900s.  He led the University of Chicago to an undefeated season in 1903–04 and coached two seasons for the Maroons men's basketball team. He left Chicago and take on the position of physical director of the Y.M.C.A. in Fort Worth, Texas in 1906.

Childs later was employed at New Trier High School in Winnetka, Illinois, from 1909 to 1956. He coached all sports at various times and also served as the school's athletic director for many years. He died in Glenview, Illinois, in 1964.

Early life
Born in 1881 to Reverend Truman D. Childs and Elizabeth Morton Leonard, Childs was a native of Harper, Kansas and graduated from Central High School in Springfield, Missouri in 1899. He attended the Y.M.C.A. training school of Chicago, graduating in 1903. He married Luise Wilhelmina Raeder in 1912.

Coaching career
In 1903, Childs was hired by Chicago's athletic director, Amos Alonzo Stagg, as the head coach for the men's basketball team as well as an athletic instructor and assistant in physical culture for the university. During his three years as the head basketball coach, the Western Conference did not recognize a league champion. However, Childs' teams finished atop of the conference standings two out of his three years, making them unofficial conference champions in 1904 and 1905. His teams finish with an overall record of 21 wins and 8 losses. During his three years as head coach, Childs coach four-time All-American and one-time national player of the year John Schommer.

Childs also served as an assistant football coach under Stagg.

Head coaching record

References

1881 births
1964 deaths
Basketball coaches from Kansas
Chicago Maroons football coaches
Chicago Maroons men's basketball coaches
High school basketball coaches in Illinois
High school football coaches in Illinois
People from Harper County, Kansas
People from Springfield, Missouri